Edmund Vance Cooke (June 5, 1866 – December 18, 1932) was a 19th- and 20th-century poet best remembered for his inspirational verse "How Did You Die?"

Cooke was born in Port Dover, Ontario. In 1898 he married Lilith Castleberry, with whom he had five children. He later read his poems on radio station WWJ in Detroit, Michigan. He died in Cleveland, Ohio.

Cooke’s poetry has been set to music by several composers, including Nellie Bangs Skelton and Kate Vanderpoel.

Books
 A Patch of Pansies (1894)
 Impertinent Poems (1903)
 Rimes to be Read (1897)
 Chronicles of the Little Tot (1905)
 Told to the Little Tot (1906)
 A Morning's Mail (1907)
 Little Songs for Two (1909)
 I Rule the House (1910)
 Basebology (1912)
 The Story Club (1912)
 The Uncommon Commoner (1913)
 Just Then Something Happened (1914)
 Cheerful Children (1923)
 Brass Tacks Ballads (1924)
 Companionable Poems (1924)
 From the Book of Extenuations (1926)

References

External links
Selected Poetry of Edmund Vance Cooke (1866-1932)
Edmund Vance Cooke papers

1866 births
1932 deaths
Writers from Ontario
American male poets
19th-century Canadian poets
Canadian male poets
20th-century American poets
20th-century Canadian poets
20th-century Canadian male writers
19th-century American male writers
20th-century American male writers